The women's 50m freestyle S13 event at the 2008 Summer Paralympics took place at the Beijing National Aquatics Center on 15 September. There were no heats in this event.

Final

Competed at 19:56.

References
 
 

Swimming at the 2008 Summer Paralympics
2008 in women's swimming